The 1939 All-Ireland Senior Football Championship was the 53rd staging of Ireland's premier Gaelic football knock-out competition. Galway entered the championship as defending champions; however, they were beaten by Mayo in the Connacht final. Kerry were the winners.

Format

Provincial Championships format changes

Leinster Championship format change
2 Preliminary rounds instead of usual 1. Involved were Longford, Carlow, Westmeath & Wicklow of course the winners qualified for a quarterfinal to meet the stronger teams.

Munster Championship format change

In 1939 Kerry were given a bye to the Munster final, preliminary round was just a lone match between Cork vs Waterford, the winners of the game played in the quarterfinals along with Tipperary, Limerick and Clare, the winners of the game played in a lone Semifinal. The format was previously used in 1933 and was used again in 1941.

All Ireland semifinals system

The All-Ireland Senior Football Championship was run on a provincial basis as usual in every 3rd year in rotation, with the four winners from Connacht, Leinster, Munster and Ulster advancing to the All-Ireland semi-finals.  The draw for these games was as follows:
 Munster V. Connacht 
 Ulster V. Leinster

Provincial championships

Connacht Senior Football Championship

Leinster Senior Football Championship

Munster Senior Football Championship

Ulster Senior Football Championship

All-Ireland Senior Football Championship

Championship statistics

Miscellaneous

 Meath win their second Leinster Title first since 1895.
 Kerry are now one behind Dublin with All Ireland titles.
 There were a number of first-time championship meetings; There were 2 first time championship meetings in the All Ireland Series at first in the semifinal stage a first meeting between Meath vs Cavan while the second was All Ireland final was the first championship meeting of Kerry vs Meath.

References

All-Ireland Senior Football Championship